Alan Tinsley Powell (born November 10, 1951) is an American politician who has served in the Georgia House of Representatives since 1991. He was originally elected as a Democrat, but switched to a Republican in 2010, citing his conservative views.

Tenure

He supported the Election Integrity Act of 2021, a Republican-supported law to restrict voting rights in Georgia. Among its many provisions, it would restrict where ballot drop boxes can be located and when they can be accessed, require photo identification for absentee voting, shift back the deadline to request an absentee ballot, limit early voting hours, and prevent anyone other than poll workers from giving food and water to voters standing in lines. Most controversially, it would restrict early voting on Sundays, when Black churches traditionally run "Souls to the Polls" get-out-the-vote efforts. Powell defended the bill, saying "Show me the suppression. There is no suppression in this bill." The legislation was passed by the Republican-controlled legislature in Georgia shortly after the 2020 elections when Democrats won the two U.S. Senate seats in Georgia and Joe Biden became the first Democratic presidential candidate to win Georgia since 1992. Then-President Donald Trump and his allies made false claims of fraud in multiple states, including Georgia, after they lost the elections.

References

1951 births
Living people
Members of the Georgia House of Representatives
Georgia (U.S. state) Democrats
Georgia (U.S. state) Republicans
People from Hartwell, Georgia
21st-century American politicians